Ma Yili (born 29 June 1976) is a Chinese actress. Ma ranked 42nd on Forbes China Celebrity 100 list in 2019.

Early life
Ma was born in Hongkou District, Shanghai on June 29, 1976, with her ancestral home in Rudong County, Nantong, Jiangsu. She entered Shanghai Theatre Academy in 1994, majoring in acting, where she graduated in 1998.

Career
Ma started her acting career in the 1996 television series Vacuum Love Records, known as China's first youth idol drama, in which her sweet appearance and strong-willed character left a deep impression on the audience. However in the next few years, Ma maintained a low profile on screen.

Ma regained attention through the television series Long Live Our Dreams (2000) and Black Hole (2001) and the film Eyes of a Beauty (2001). She actually shaved her head for her role in Long Live Our Dreams. She gained further popularity after she played the role of Ziwei in the third season of the popular drama My Fair Princess (2003). Next came the hit series Qiao's Grand Courtyard (2006), where Ma played a innocent girl who matures through a painful romance. She then starred in the highly popular youth series Struggle (2007). Ma's role as a passionate, direct and optimistic young woman resonated with the thoughts of the young generation, and shot her to widespread fame.

Following her breakthrough, Ma has won various honors and awards, such as the Golden Phoenix Award and Huading Award, and the Best Actress award at the Changchun Film Festival for her role in Life Today (2007), Best Actress award at the Asia Rainbow TV Awards for her role in Marriage Battle (2010) and Best Supporting Actress award at the China Image Film Festival for her role in Tracks Kong Lingxue (2011).

Ma then starred in Two City One Family (2011), which reflects the differences of a couple who come from different cities in China. Ma, who is of Shanghai descent, successfully portrayed the role of a Beijing young lady, and clinched the Best Actress award at the China TV Drama Awards. She then starred in both seasons of Puberty Hit Menopause (2013) which earned high ratings; as well as family drama Little Daddy (2013), directed by her husband Wen Zhang and which she serves as producer.

In 2015, Ma starred in Swan Dive for Love, a series that narrates the story of a white-collar couple striving to make themselves richer amid a series of challenges. She won the Best Actress award at the Huading Awards for her portrayal of a determined and strong-minded career woman. The following year, she starred in Chinese Style Relationship, a critically acclaimed comedy-drama that depicts three Chinese couples as the navigate through life and love. Ma was nominated for Best Actress at the Shanghai Television Festival.

In 2017, Ma starred in romance/family drama The First Half of My Life. Opposite from her usual strong characters, Ma played a struggling housewife in the series. The television series was a major ratings hit in China and was hotly debated on social media sites like Weibo.

In 2018, Ma played a supporting role in the female-centric war film Goddesses in the Flames of War, reportedly receiving no wages for the film. She won the Best Supporting Actress award at the China Movie Channel Media Awards for her performance. Another film which stars in, Enter the Forbidden City won the award for Best Film.
The same year, she starred in the mystery film Lost, Found alongside Yao Chen; a remake of the Korean film Missing; as well as crime film The Road Not Taken.

Other activities
Ma was appointed the National Ambassador for UNICEF China in 2015.

Personal life
Ma was married to Chinese actor Wen Zhang in 2008, and they have a daughter named Wen Zhujun (born 20 September 2008). They first met while appearing in a Chinese historical television drama The Jinyiwei Guard. When they filmed Struggle together, they became lovers. In August 2013, when she was pregnant with her second child, Wen Zhang and actress Yao Di had an extramarital affair. On July 28, 2019, they announced their divorce on Sina Weibo.

Filmography

Film

Television series

Awards and nominations

References

External links

1976 births
Shanghai Theatre Academy alumni
Actresses from Shanghai
Living people
21st-century Chinese actresses
20th-century Chinese actresses
Chinese stage actresses
Chinese film actresses
Chinese television actresses